As Young as We Are is a 1958 American drama film directed by Bernard Girard and written by Meyer Dolinsky. The film stars Robert Harland, Pippa Scott, Majel Barrett, Ty Hardin, Barry Atwater and Carla Hoffman. The film was released in September 1958, by Paramount Pictures.

Plot
Kim Hutchins (Scott) and Joyce Goodwin (Barrett) are hired by Principal Paul Evans (Dyrenforth) reluctantly because they have no experience. When driving, Hutchins and Goodwin's car breaks down. A man (Harland) comes along to help them. Hutchins is attracted to the young man, but shocked when she finds he is one of her students. The student falls in love with Hutchins and kidnaps her. On their way to Las Vegas to get married, an accident happens. After everything is cleared up, Hutchins is allowed to teach again.

Cast 
Robert Harland as Hank Moore
Pippa Scott as Kim Hutchins
Majel Barrett as Joyce Goodwin
Ty Hardin as Roy Nielson
Barry Atwater as Mr. Peterson
Carla Hoffman as Nina
Ellen Corby as Nettie McPherson
Harold Dyrenforth as Mr. Paul Evans
Ross Elliott as Bob
Linda Watkins as Mrs. Hutchins
Beverly Long as Marge
Mack Williams as Doctor Alan Hutchins

References

Citations

Sources

External links 
 

1958 films
1950s English-language films
Paramount Pictures films
American drama films
1958 drama films
Films directed by Bernard Girard
Films about scandalous teacher–student relationships
American black-and-white films
1950s American films